The M44 cyanide device (also called a cyanide gun or cyanide trap) is used to kill coyotes, feral dogs, and foxes. It is made from four parts: a capsule holder wrapped with cloth or other soft material, a small plastic capsule containing 0.88 grams of sodium cyanide, a spring-powered ejector, and a 5-7 inch stake. To install the trap, the stake is first driven down into the ground, and then the capsule is put in the holder, screwed onto the cocked ejector, and  secured to the stake. The wrapped capsule holder is smeared with scented bait to attract coyotes and make them bite and pull on it. (The use of a bite-and-pull action makes the trap less likely to be set off by non-canine wildlife.) When the trap is triggered, the spring propels a dose of sodium cyanide into the animal's mouth, and the sodium cyanide combines with water in the mouth to produce poisonous cyanide gas.
In addition to the cyanide, the capsule contains a brightly-colored particle marker (orange in capsules used by the Wildlife Services, and yellow in capsules prepared for other users).

History
The M44 was invented in the 1960s to replace a similar device known as a 'Coyote Getter', which had been in use since the 1930s. The Coyote Getter used a .38 Special pistol cartridge case to contain the sodium cyanide mixture, and ejected the cyanide with a primer. The wad and cyanide were ejected with great force and could be quite hazardous. For example, in 1959 a 15-year-old boy lost one eye when he accidentally set off a Coyote Getter by stepping on it, in 1966 a man was hit in the left hand and died from cyanide poisoning, and between 1965 and 1971 at least 17 humans were injured by Coyote Getters. Therefore, in the early 1960s the  Fish and Wildlife Service started to develop a safer, spring-based replacement device. Much of the work was done by James Poteet, a predator control specialist in Midland, Texas who received a patent for the device in 1967. The new device was gradually phased into federal management programs beginning in 1967, and by November 1970 it had substantially replaced the Coyote Getter.

Since its introduction, the M44 design has been updated several times to solve problems such as caking in the cyanide capsules or malfunctioning ejectors. One effort in 1977-79 resulted in a completely new, slightly larger cyanide ejector called the M50. However, a field evaluation in 1982 showed that the older Poteet-designed M44 actually performed better, and the M50 was phased out. In 1984, the M44 ejector body and capsule holder were redesigned as it became necessary to replace the dies that had been used since 1967 to cast those metal parts. That model is still produced today, with some major adjustments

Use against canines
The M44 is in frequent use by the USDA Wildlife Services in their programs to eliminate coyotes. For example, in 2016, out of the 76,963 coyotes that Wildlife Services killed, the M44 was used to kill 12,511 of them (16%). State agencies in South Dakota, Montana, Wyoming, New Mexico and Texas also use the device.

More recently, M44 devices have begun to be used in Australia to control foxes and wild dogs. There they are loaded with sodium fluoroacetate (also known as 1080 poison) or PAPP (4%27-Aminopropiophenone) instead of sodium cyanide, and are called 'Canid Pest Ejectors'. The NSW Parks and Wildlife Service carried out trials in 2005-2011, and in 2016 they were approved for general use. The mechanical devices and lure heads are sold freely, but because the toxin capsules contain a regulated poison they require the purchaser to have a state permit.

Criticism
Use of the M44 device has been criticized by animal welfare and environmental groups, as the devices have many unintended victims, including pets and endangered species; strongly indicative of a lack of selectivity, instead of the supposed high level.  In 2003, Dennis Slaugh of Vernal, Utah, was on public lands and mistook an M-44 for a survey marker. When he pulled on it, the device shot sodium cyanide powder on his face and chest causing him to become violently ill.  In February 2006, an M44 device killed a man's dog in Utah, as the dog and owner were walking through public land. The man was also affected by the cyanide in the device, and is seeking compensation from the US Department of Agriculture's Wildlife Service, along with the Utah Department of Food and Agriculture.  In 2012 a family dog was killed in Texas. In 2017 a 14-year-old boy in Idaho was injured, and his dog killed, by an M44 near his home. Between 2013–2016, M44 devices killed 22 pets and livestock animals. On April 11, 2017, a month after the boy in Idaho was injured, the U.S. Department of Agriculture announced that it would be ending the use of the device in Idaho indefinitely.

In August 2017, WildEarth Guardians submitted a petition to the Environmental Protection Agency requesting that it prohibit use of sodium cyanide devices. During the public comment period WildEarth Guardians and the Center for Biological Diversity organized a write-in campaign and the EPA received more than 20,000 letters from the public against the devices. In an interim decision in June 2019, the EPA decided to keep the M-44 devices approved (noting that without them  producers of sheep, goats, and cattle would likely incur higher costs and/or more livestock loss), but added some restrictions e.g. about use near public roads or private land.

References

Pest control